Peter A. Porter was a college football player for the Yale Bulldogs' early teams. He presided over the meeting in which Princeton, Columbia, and Rutgers adopted the first standardized rules.

References

Yale Bulldogs football players
19th-century players of American football